The Delice River, perhaps the ancient Cappadox, is the major river of Cappadocia in Anatolia, Turkey. It flows into the Kızılırmak River (Halys) at  before flowing into the Black Sea.

Rivers of Turkey
Landforms of Kırıkkale Province